In mathematics, the running angle is the angle of consecutive vectors  with respect to the base line, i.e.
  

Usually, it is more informative to compute it using a four-quadrant version of the arctan function in a mathematical software library.

See also 
 Differential geometry
 Polar distribution

Penmanship